Fedrizzi is an Italian-language surname. Notable people with the surname include:

Dede Fedrizzi (born 1959), Brazilian film maker, photographer, art director, and artist 
Michele Fedrizzi (born 1991), Italian volleyball player

Italian-language surnames
Patronymic surnames
Surnames from given names